Drew Petzing (born March 12, 1987) is an American football coach who is the offensive coordinator for the Arizona Cardinals of the National Football League (NFL). He previously served as an assistant coach for the Cleveland Browns and Minnesota Vikings.

Early years
Petzing attended Middlebury College where he played defensive back for the Panthers in 2005 and 2006 before injuries cut short his playing career. He spent the next two years as a volunteer student assistant before graduating in 2009 with a degree in economics. He minored in math and philosophy.

Coaching career

Cleveland Browns
In 2013, Petzing was hired by the Cleveland Browns as a football operations intern.

Minnesota Vikings
In 2014, Petzing was hired by the Minnesota Vikings as an offensive assistant under head coach Mike Zimmer. In 2016, he was promoted to assistant wide receivers coach. In 2018, Petzing was promoted to assistant quarterbacks coach. In 2019, he was promoted to wide receivers coach.

Cleveland Browns (second stint)
On January 24, 2020, Petzing returned to the Cleveland Browns and was hired as their tight ends coach under head coach Kevin Stefanski. Petzing missed the team's week 12 game against the Jacksonville Jaguars in 2020 due to the birth of his child. He missed the team's wild card playoff game against the Pittsburgh Steelers on January 10, 2021, due to COVID-19 protocols.

Personal life 
Petzing graduated Middlebury College
with a degree in economics in 2009. He is married to his wife, Louisa.

References

External links
 Arizona Cardinals profile

1987 births
Living people
Arizona Cardinals coaches
Boston College Eagles football coaches
Cleveland Browns coaches
Coaches of American football from New York (state)
Harvard Crimson football coaches
Minnesota Vikings coaches 
National Football League offensive coordinators
Players of American football from New York (state) 
Sportspeople from Rochester, New York
Yale Bulldogs football coaches